Vivodi was a private telecom operator in Greece which offered telephone rates for OTE subscribers.

ADSL
Vivodi's main service was internet services, and ADSL was its main product for private customers.

Vivodi offered ADSL lines by utilizing the local loop unbundling (LLU), which allowed private companies to have full or shared access to the Local Loop of the customer. Through this way it offered ADSL lines with data rates up to 4 Mbit/s and ADSL2+ lines with data rates up to 20 Mbit/s in some districts of the Athens Metropolitan Area, as well as in Thessaloniki.

Vivodi was aquired by On Telecoms, a telecommunications business backed by UK-based Argo Capital Management, in 2009.

See also
 Broadband in Greece

References

External links
 Official website

Internet service providers of Greece